The horror novel Frankenstein by Mary Shelley has inspired a number of films:

From the silent film era:
Frankenstein (1910)
Life Without Soul (1915)
Il mostro di Frankenstein (1920)

A film series by Universal Studios:
Frankenstein (1931)
Bride of Frankenstein (1935)
Son of Frankenstein (1939)
The Ghost of Frankenstein (1942)
Frankenstein Meets the Wolf Man (1943)
House of Frankenstein (1944)
House of Dracula (1945)
Abbott and Costello Meet Frankenstein (1948)

A film series by Hammer Film Productions:
The Curse of Frankenstein (1957)
The Revenge of Frankenstein (1958)
The Evil of Frankenstein (1963)
Frankenstein Created Woman (1967)
Frankenstein Must Be Destroyed (1969)
The Horror of Frankenstein (1970)
Frankenstein and the Monster from Hell (1974)

Other adaptations of the novel:
Flesh for Frankenstein (1973)
Frankenstein: The True Story (1973)
Frankenstein Unbound (1990)
Frankenstein (1992 film) (1992)
Mary Shelley's Frankenstein (film) (1994)
Frankenstein (US TV miniseries) (2004)
Frankenstein (2004 film) (2004)
Frankenstein (2007 film) (2007)
Frankenstein (2015 film) (2015)

Adaptations loosely based on the novel:
Frankenstein 1970 (1958)
Young Frankenstein (1974)
The Bride (film) (1985)
I, Frankenstein (2014) 
Victor Frankenstein (2015)
The Frankenstein Chronicles (2015 TV Series)